Paso Robles High School (PRHS) is the only comprehensive high school located in the city of Paso Robles, California. The school receives its students from George H. Flamson Middle School and Daniel E. Lewis Middle School, both located in Paso Robles, as well as from the Lillian Larsen School, a public K-8 school in San Miguel, California, Cappy Culver Elementary and Middle School, a public K-8 school in Lake Nacimiento, California, and Pleasant Valley Elementary School, a public K-8 school located in an outlying area of northeastern San Luis Obispo County. Additionally, the school receives students from private K-8 schools such as Trinity Lutheran School and St. Rose Catholic School, both located in Paso Robles, and some from Santa Lucia School located in Templeton, California 

The school boasts strong vocational, agricultural, and college preparatory programs, as well as a limited number of honors and AP courses in the fields of history/social science (honors/AP), English language/literature (honors/AP), mathematics (AP) and science (AP). Foreign languages offered include Spanish, French, and American Sign Language.  The school has also maintained the largest SkillsUSA organization in California for several years, and it is an AVID National Demonstration School.

The first high school in San Luis Obispo County, Paso Robles High School was built in 1892 and graduated its first senior class in 1896. Constructed with locally made bricks, the stately three-story structure was located at 17th Street and Vine Street, where Marie Bauer Elementary sits now. A decade upon opening, the high school and upper-level auditorium would languish in the aftermath of the San Francisco Earthquake in 1906. A new location was built at 24th and Spring Street, and the faulted building was later razed in 1939. In the 1960s, the 24th Street campus was refurbished, with subsequent additions to what later became Flamson Middle School. (By 2003, the San Simeon Earthquake rendered the structures unsalvageable, and a new middle school was constructed.) By 1980, the third PRHS campus was built on Niblick Road, where it stands today. However, football games continue at War Memorial Stadium on the Flamson Middle School campus to a faithful attendance of PRHS boosters. Most other competitive sporting events are held on the PRHS campus. Although the school's athletic facilities are somewhat limited, the campus plays host to an extensive agricultural education facility. The school's mascot is the bearcat.

Paso Robles High School was ranked #5 in U.S. News & World Report's "Best High Schools in the San Luis Obispo, CA Area".

Sports

Paso Robles High School was the northernmost high school in the western half of the CIF Southern Section for decades. 

In 2016, Paso Robles transferred into the CIF Central Section along with most schools in San Luis Obispo County in a bid to reduce travel expenses and to be more regional. Now playing in the Mountain League as part of the Central Coast Athletic Association, in years past PRHS used to belong to the since-reformed Northern League, Los Padres League and Pac-8 League memberships.

Boys teams
Football — CIF SS Champions: 1951, 1952, 1953 (Northern Division), 1972, 1974 (Div. A), 1998, 1999, 2000 (Div. X), 2014 (Northern Div.) / CIF Southern California Finalist: 2014 (Div. III)Cross Country — CIF SS Champions: 1936, 1937, 1938, 1940, 1941 (Div. C) / CIF CS Champions: 2018 (Div. 1)Wrestling — CIF SS Champions: 2001 (Dual Meet Div. V)BasketballSoccerBaseball — CIF SS Champions: 1952 (Northern Group)TennisTrack and FieldVolleyballSwimming & Diving — CIF SS Champions: 1998, 1999, 2000, 2001 (Div. III)Water PoloGolfCheerleading

Girls teams
Volleyball — CIF SS Champions: 1988 (Division 2-A), 1995 (Div. IV)Cross Country SoccerBasketballTennisTrack and Field — CIF SS Champions: 1987 (Div. 1-A)SoftballSwimming & DivingWater PoloGolfCheerleadingStunt — CIF CS Champions: 2022

Journalism
Crimson is the award-winning student news magazine of Paso Robles High School. Crimson is the current form of the monthly tabloid newspaper founded in the 1940s named The Crimson Chronicle and originally The Bearcat. Crimson staff members attend national and local journalism conventions and have won recognition in national and statewide competitions for writing, photography, and design. The publication and website are currently advised by Jeff Mount. Many graduates from the program have gone on to careers in journalism, law, communications, and/or design.

Notable alumni
 Bo Bonnheim, Class of 2011, Fresno State offensive lineman
 Jason Botts, Class of 1998, Texas Rangers MLB player
 Jim Buchanan, Class of 1989, Oregon State offensive lineman
 Ken Buck, Class of 1949, New York Giants 1954 draft choice/Pacific Hall of Fame member
 Bob Cantu, Class of 1992, USC basketball coach
 David Cone, Class of 2008, Biola University basketball coach
 Travis Draper, Class of 2003, USC Trojans offensive lineman
 Derrick Jasper, Class of 2006, Kentucky/UNLV basketball guard
 Bailey Gaither, Class of 2015, selected in the 2022 USFL Draft; starting wide receiver for the Pittsburgh Maulers
 Chris Gardner, Class of 1987, Houston Astros pitcher
 Jason Holmes, Class of 2001, TV actor on Criminal Minds
 Ivan Huff, Class of 1977, U.S. Olympic Trials qualifier/10th-ranked steeplechase runner in the world in 1986
 Ryan Hynes, Class of 2003, Georgia Southern basketball forward
 Paul Kinne, Class of 1972, Montana State basketball guard
 Rusty Kuntz, pro baseball player and coach; winner of two World Series
 William McKeithen, Class of 2002, perfect SAT score of 1600
 Frank Minini, Chicago Bears receiver/kick return specialist
 Mitch Monteiro, Class of 2005, 2010 NCAA Wrestling All-American
 Josh Oliver, Class of 2015, tight end for the Jacksonville Jaguars/Baltimore Ravens; selected in the 2019 NFL Draft
 Don Parish, Class of 1966, Stanford Hall of Fame inductee; selected in the 1970 NFL Draft; linebacker for the (Arizona) Cardinals/Denver Broncos
 Hamp Pool, Class of 1933, professional football player and college coach
 Ray Robins, Class of 1998, Princeton forward/pro basketball player for Thor Thorlakshofn (Iceland)
 Mitchell Van Dyk, Class of 2009, offensive lineman for the Pittsburgh Steelers; selected by the St. Louis Rams in the 2014 NFL Draft
 Lonnie Watson, Class of 2010, CSUN guard

References

High schools in San Luis Obispo County, California
Buildings and structures in Paso Robles, California
Public high schools in California
Educational institutions established in 1901
1901 establishments in California